More of Bobby's Greatest Hits is Bobby Vinton's second compilation of tracks from singles from 1964–1966.  Nine of the ten tracks previously charted on the Billboard Hot 100, the lone exception being "Careless" which "bubbled under" (although it reached #82 on the competing Cashbox charts).  The hits "Clinging Vine", "What Color (Is a Man)", "Dum-De-Da" and "Tears" (previously a hit for Ken Dodd) make their album debut on this compilation.

Track listing

Personnel
Bob Morgan – producer
Billy Sherrill – producer
Sid Maurer – cover painting

Charts
Singles – Billboard (North America)

References

1966 greatest hits albums
Bobby Vinton compilation albums
Albums produced by Billy Sherrill
Epic Records compilation albums